Lunsar is a town in Marampa Chiefdom, Port Loko District in the Northern Province of Sierra Leone. It is the largest town in Port Loko District by population. The Britannica estimate of the population of Lunsar is 36,108. The town is one of the main commercial and business hub in the North of Sierra Leone. Lunsar lies approximately 50 miles east of Freetown and about 18 miles south-east of the district capital of Port Loko. The inhabitants of Lunsar are largely from the Temne ethnic group.

History
Its most recent history has been an iron ore mining town. The ore, for the most part, is set in stone which forms a huge mountain, called Massaboin Hill. The word stone in the local Temne language is "Sar," and thus befits the area where the iron ore was found. Thus, the town's initial name was "Ro-Sar" meaning the place where the stones are found. Ro-sar later evolved to Lunsar during the colonial era.

Sports & culture
Lunsar is the home to Sierra Leone's largest cycling team, the Lunsar Cycling Team. The team has run the Tour de Lunsar, the country's largest cycle race, annually since 2016.

In 2022, Fatima Deborah Conteh who raced for Lunsar Cycling Team, was offered a professional cycling contract by Canyon / SRAM Generation, making her the first Sierra Leonean to be given a pro contract.

See also 
 Railway stations in Sierra Leone

References

External links 
 

Populated places in Sierra Leone